Maitland Secondary School, formerly known as Maitland Boys' High School,is a school in the Western Cape. It has been a state high school since 1884, and can trace its history as a private school decades further back into the nineteenth century.

The school moved to its current site in 1891 with a single storey classroom block and the two-storey Principal's residence and hostel for boarders, known as “Hinder House”.

The school was co Ed. Girls on one side of the school and boys on the other side during the breaks.
It was only when you were in standard nine and ten were the girls and boys were allowed to mix
In the fifties and sixties the school participated in Cadets.Every Friday after school they would practice band and the cadets would march down the street in full Military garb until one day they were inspected by the commander from the CapeTown castle and were told that they were a sorry lot who could not march like soldiers. That was the last year they had cadets

External links
 Schools 4 SA

Educational institutions with year of establishment missing
Educational institutions established in 1884
High schools in South Africa
Schools in Cape Town